Renzo Saravia (born 16 June 1993) is an Argentine footballer who plays as a right back for Campeonato Brasileiro Série A club Atlético Mineiro.

Club career

Early career
Born in Villa de María del Río Seco in the interior of Córdoba Province, Saravia had not played for any football clubs before he moved to the provincial capital; his father Reynaldo, a retired policeman, staked everything he had on finding him a team. From the age of 9 to 15 he played for Instituto Atlético Central Córdoba, where his teammates included Paulo Dybala.

Saravia then signed for Club Atlético Las Palmas and was loaned to Club Atlético Belgrano for a year with the option to buy for 150,000 Argentine pesos.

Belgrano
Saravia was promoted to Belgrano's first team in January 2013.

Racing Club
In July 2017, he signed for Racing Club de Avellaneda, where he won the 2018–19 Argentine Primera División.

Porto
In June 2019, Saravia signed a four-year deal with FC Porto. He made his debut on 13 August in the second leg of the third qualifying round of the UEFA Champions League at home to FC Krasnodar, and was substituted for striker Zé Luís with the team already 3–0 down after 38 minutes in a 3–2 loss. Still unused in the Primeira Liga, he scored his first goal to open a 3–0 group win at Casa Pia A.C. in the Taça da Liga on 5 December.

Internacional (loan)
On 28 February 2020, Saravia joined Campeonato Brasileiro Série A club Internacional on loan, where he spent two seasons.

Botafogo
On 8 April 2022, he signed a permanent deal with Botafogo, staying at the club for the remainder of the season.

Atlético Mineiro
On 16 February 2023, Saravia joined Atlético Mineiro.

International career
Saravia made his international debut for Argentina on 8 September 2018 in a 3-0 international friendly against Guatemala. Manager Lionel Scaloni named him in the 23-man squad for the 2019 Copa América in Brazil, where he played two group games for the bronze medallists.

Career statistics

Club

International
Statistics accurate as of match played 18 November 2019.

Honours
Racing Club	
Argentine Primera División: 2018–19

Porto
Taça de Portugal: 2019–20

References

External links

1993 births
Living people
Sportspeople from Córdoba Province, Argentina
Argentine footballers
Argentina international footballers
Association football defenders
Argentine Primera División players
Campeonato Brasileiro Série A players
Club Atlético Belgrano footballers
Racing Club de Avellaneda footballers
FC Porto players
Sport Club Internacional players
Botafogo de Futebol e Regatas players
Clube Atlético Mineiro players
Argentine expatriate footballers
Expatriate footballers in Portugal
Expatriate footballers in Brazil
Argentine expatriate sportspeople in Portugal
Argentine expatriate sportspeople in Brazil
2019 Copa América players